Ulysses McAtee (September 19, 1907 – death date unknown) was an American Negro league second baseman in the 1930s.

A native of Hopkinsville, Kentucky, McAtee played for the Louisville White Sox in 1931. In seven recorded games, he posted two hits in 15 plate appearances.

References

External links
 and Seamheads

1907 births
Year of death unknown
Place of death unknown
Louisville White Sox players
Baseball second basemen
Baseball players from Kentucky
Sportspeople from Hopkinsville, Kentucky